Camerata, a dormitory or a comrade in Italian or an adjective meaning chambered in Latin, may refer to:

Music
 Camerata (music), a small chamber orchestra or choir
 Camerata Bariloche, an Argentine chamber music ensemble founded in 1977
 Florentine Camerata, an Italian musical association of the late sixteenth century

Places
 Camerata Cornello, a municipality in the Province of Bergamo in the Italian region of Lombardy
 Camerata Nuova, a municipality in the Province of Rome in the Italian region Lazio
 Camerata Picena, a municipality in the Province of Ancona in the Italian region Marche

Other
 Camerata (Crinoidea), an extinct subclass of crinoids from the Paleozoic
 Camerata (flatworm), a flatworm genus in the family Uteriporidae
 Giuseppe Camerata (1718–1803), Italian painter and engraver
 Charles Félix Jean-Baptiste Camerata-Passionei di Mazzoleni (1826–1853), French-Italian aristocrat